Stuart Urquhart (born 26 March 1995) is a Scottish footballer who plays as a defender. Urquhart, who most recently played for Dunfermline Athletic, has also played for the Scotland U17 team.

Playing career

Club
Urquhart made his professional debut for Dumbarton (on loan from Rangers) on 16 February 2013 in a 3–2 Scottish First Division match, playing the whole of a loss to Raith Rovers. He went on to play two more Scottish First Division games whilst at Dumbarton, featuring in a 0–2 loss against Falkirk and a 2–2 draw against Cowdenbeath.

On 18 September 2013, Urquhart signed a three-year contract with Coventry City after turning down a contract at Rangers.

Urquhart left Coventry City by mutual consent on 18 August 2014 and on 23 August joined Scottish League One team Dunfermline Athletic on a one-year deal. After making fourteen appearances for Dunfermline, Urquhart was released at the end of the season.

International
Urquhart made his international debut for the Scotland U-17 in a 1–0 UEFA European Under-17 Championship win against Macedonia U-17. He went on to play 7 more games for the Under-17's squad, matches against Luxembourg U-17, Switzerland U-17, San Marino U-17, Macedonia U-17, Lithuania U-17, Iceland U-17 and Denmark U-17.

Personal life
After leaving Dunfermline Athletic in May 2015, Urquhart announced that he had been diagnosed with a heart problem, potentially bringing an end to his playing career.

Career statistics
Stats according to,

References

External links

1995 births
Living people
Scottish footballers
Scottish Football League players
Scotland youth international footballers
Footballers from Glasgow
Association football defenders
Rangers F.C. players
Dumbarton F.C. players
Coventry City F.C. players
Dunfermline Athletic F.C. players
Scottish Professional Football League players